Fourilles is a commune in the Allier department in central France.

Geography
The river Bouble flows northeast through the northern part of the commune.

Population

See also
Communes of the Allier department

References

Communes of Allier
Allier communes articles needing translation from French Wikipedia